Maurud is a surname. Notable people with the surname include:

Atle Maurud (born 1970), Norwegian footballer
Jørn Sigurd Maurud (born 1960), Norwegian jurist

See also
Maurus (disambiguation)

Norwegian-language surnames